Westside Seattle, formerly The Westside Weekly, is a weekly newspaper that serves the areas of West Seattle, Ballard, White Center, Burien, Des Moines, and SeaTac in Washington state.

History
On August 21, 2013, Robinson Newspapers announced that it would combine the Ballard News-Tribune, the Highline Times, the West Seattle Herald, and White Center News into The Westside Weekly on September 6, 2013. The name of The Westside Weekly changed to Westside Seattle in June 2017.

In 2014, Amanda Knox began writing for the paper.

On April 30, 2021, Westside Seattle published its final print issue while maintaining an online presence.

References

External links
 Official website
 Robinson News

Newspapers published in Seattle